Stinker may refer to:

 Southern giant petrel, a large seabird of the southern oceans
 Swamp wallaby of eastern Australia
 Stinker Point, Elephant Island, Antarctica
 a nickname for some Pitts Special aerobatic airplanes, due to the picture of a skunk painted on them
 a nickname for Gollum, a character in The Lord of the Rings novels
 Harold Pinker, a character in P. G. Wodehouse's Jeeves stories also known as "Stinker" Pinker

See also
 Stinky (disambiguation)